Daowei Tibetan Ethnic Township is an ethnic township in Xunhua Salar Autonomous County, Haidong, Qinghai, China.

Geography 
Daowei Tibetan Ethnic Township is located within the southeast of Xunhua Salar Autonomous County, within the prefecture-level city of Haidong. The ethnic township has 32,900 mu of arable land.

Administrative divisions 
Daowei Tibetan Ethnic Township administers 27 administrative villages, and 34 natural villages, although the latter have no formal status. The ethnic township's 27 administrative villages are as follows:

 Gulei Village
 Qitaibao Village
 Helongbao Village
 Bilong Village
 Hetang Village
 Hezhuang Village
 Ningba Village
 Zhangsha Village
 Duowa Village
 Duoshize Village
 Ejia Village
 Wumandao Village
 Lake Village
 Lamulongwa Village
 Deman Village
 Xunwa Village
 Lilun Village
 Wangjia Village
 Sanmucang Village
 Danma Village
 Jiacang Village
 Muhong Village
 Yamu Village
 Tiegaleng Village
 Wuman Village
 Kema Village
 Xichong Village

Demographics 
As of 2018, Daowei Tibetan Ethnic Township has a population of 13,614 people.

In 2010, the ethnic township had a total population of 11,635 people: 5,774 males and 5,861 females: 2,868 under 14 years old, 7,836 aged between 15 and 64 and 931 over 65 years old.

Tibetans comprise the main population group in the ethnic township, although there are also sizeable Salar, Hui, and Han populations.

Culture 
The ethnic township has a memorial hall devoted to Tibetan religious teacher and politician Geshe Sherab Gyatso, who was born in the area.

Daowei Tibetan Ethnic Township claims to be the origin of two styles of Tibetan ethnic drumming: Chi Drumming and Xia'erqun Drumming. Chi Drumming is included in the Chinese government's , whereas Xia'erqun Drumming is included in the Qinghai provincial Provincial Intangible Cultural Heritage List.

References 
 

Ethnic townships of the People's Republic of China
Haidong
Township-level divisions of Qinghai